Hendrix is an unincorporated community in McLean County, in the U.S. state of Illinois.

History
A post office called Hendrix was established in 1876, and remained in operation until 1910. The community has the name of John Hendrix, a pioneer settler.

References

Unincorporated communities in McLean County, Illinois